Sincero (English: Sincere) is the 11th studio album recorded by Puerto Rican performer Chayanne. It was released by Sony Music Latin and Columbia Records on August 26, 2003 (see 2003 in music). This album became his second number-one set on the Billboard Top Latin Albums and received a nomination for a Grammy Award for Best Latin Pop Album in the 46th Annual Grammy Awards on February 8, 2004, losing to No Es lo Mismo by Alejandro Sanz.

The album spawned six singles with the lead single Un Siglo Sin Tí being certified gold in Chile.

Track listing
The track listing from Billboard.com

Music videos
Un Siglo Sin Tí
Caprichosa
Sentada Aquí En Mi Alma

Personnel
The information form Allmusic.
Estéfano — Producer
Julio C. Reyes – Producer, Composer, Arranger, Programmer
Rey Sánchez — Producer
Franco De Vita – Producer, Composer, Arranger
René L. Toledo — Producer
Luis Fernando Ochoa — Producer
Patty Bolívar — Executive producer
Mauricio Gasca — Arranger, Programming, Engineer
Vlado Meller — Mastering
José Luis Pagán — Guitar, arranger, programming, vocals
Ángel Carrasco — A&R
Mario Houben — Graphic design
Kevin Apple — Photography
Kelly Nash — Make-Up

Chart performance

Sales and certifications

References

2003 albums
Chayanne albums
Spanish-language albums
Sony Discos albums
Columbia Records albums
Albums produced by Estéfano
Albums produced by Julio Reyes Copello